Lupa Island may refer to:

Lupa Island (Hungary), an island in the Danube just north of Budapest, Hungary
Lupa Island (Philippines), an island in the Sulu archipelago, Philippines